The Barkley Marathons is an ultramarathon trail race held each year in Frozen Head State Park in Morgan County, Tennessee. Some racers have claimed that it is longer. If runners complete three laps this is known as the "fun run". Generally two of the first four loops are run clockwise and the other two counterclockwise. If multiple runners begin a fifth loop then they are sent off in alternating directions. The race is limited to a 60-hour period from the start of the first loop, and takes place in March or early April of each year.

History
The Barkley course was the brain child of Gary "Lazarus Lake" Cantrell and Karl Henn (Raw Dog). The idea for the race was inspired upon hearing about the 1977 escape of James Earl Ray, the assassin of Martin Luther King Jr., from nearby Brushy Mountain State Penitentiary. Ray covered only about  after running 54.5 hours in the woods hiding from air searches during the day. Cantrell said to himself, "I could do at least 100 miles," mocking Ray's low mileage. Thus, the Barkley Marathons was born. Cantrell named the race for his longtime neighbor and running companion, Barry Barkley. It was first run in 1986. Barkley died in 2019 at age 70.

For the early years, the Barkley was 50-55 miles or so, with about 25,000-27,000 feet of climbing. In 1988 "Frozen" Ed Furtaw, from North Carolina, became the first to finish the original short version of the course with 32:14. In 1989, the course was extended. The 55-mile version was referred to as “the short one” and the 100-miler, “the long one.” In 1995, Mark Williams, of the United Kingdom, became the first to finish the full 100-mile version of the Barkley Marathons with a time of 59:28:48.

The 2020 event was cancelled due to the COVID-19 pandemic.

In 2023, Jasmin Paris became the fourth woman to complete the 3 loop 'Fun Run' twice and only the second to start the 4th loop. Sue Johnston previously started the fourth loop in 2001. Previous women to have completed the 3 loop 'Fun Run' are Suzi Thibeault (1991, 1994), Nancy Hamilton (1991, 1993), Sue Johnston (2000, 2001) and  Beverley Anderson-Abbs (2012, 2013). They have all completed the 3 loop 'Fun Run' twice.

Race description

Registration
The Barkley is limited to 40 runners and usually fills up quickly the day registration opens. Requirements and times to submit an entry application are a closely guarded secret with no details advertised publicly. Potential entrants must complete an essay on "Why I Should be Allowed to Run in the Barkley," pay a $1.60 application fee, and complete other requirements subject to change. If accepted, an entrant receives a "letter of condolence." Upon arriving, first-time Barkley runners, known as virgins, are required to bring a license plate from their state/country as part of the entrance fee. Previous racers are required to bring an additional "fee" which in the past has included things such as a white shirt, socks, or a flannel shirt, as a donation for being a non-finisher. These donations are apparently based on the current needs of Lazarus Lake at the time. Prior finishers of the marathon who return to run again must submit a pack of Camel cigarettes as part of the registration fee. Race bib number one is always given to the person deemed to be the least likely to finish one lap out of all who have applied; a "human sacrifice," as Cantrell calls it.

Course
The course itself, which has changed distance, route, and elevation many times since its inaugural run, currently consists of an approximate  unmarked loop with no aid stations except water at two points along the route. The loop begins and ends at the yellow road gate where the runners' and supporters' parked cars stay. Runners of the 100-mile version run this loop five times, taking a counterclockwise direction for loops two and four, followed by each runner alternating direction on loop five, after the first-placed runner's choice. Depending on the start time of the first loop, either the second and fourth loops are run at night, or the first, third, and fifth loops are run at night. Runners who complete three circuits of the loop (60-miles) are said to have completed a "fun run".

With  of accumulated vertical climb (and the same amount of descent), the 100-mile run is considered to be one of the most challenging ultramarathons held in the United States, if not the world. As of 2018, about 55% of the races had ended with no finishers.

The 100-mile and 60-mile distances are nominal. While a nominal distance of 20 miles, which only covers the horizontal distance, the actual length of the loop varies due to changes in the elevations on the course.

Timing and other requirements

The Barkley starts any time from midnight to noon on race day, with one hour till race start signaled by blowing a conch. The race officially begins when the race director lights a cigarette.

In addition to running, competitors must find between 9 and 14 books along the course (the exact number varies each year) and remove the page corresponding to the runner's race number from each book as proof of completion. Because of this Competitors are only issued Odd numbers. Competitors get a new race number, and thus a new page requirement, at the start of each lap.

The cut-off time for the 100-mile race is 60 hours overall, or an average of 12 hours per loop, and the cut-off for the 60-mile version of the race is 40 hours overall, which averages out to approximately 13 hours and 20 minutes per loop. This also includes any rest/food time between loops. Once a competitor has started a loop they are not allowed to receive any assistance, other than from fellow runners, until they have finished that loop. Out of more than 1,000 starts, the 100-mile race has been completed within the official 60-hour cut-off 21 times by 17 different runners, with two two-time finishers and one three-time finisher. However, in 2006, nobody finished even the 60-mile "fun run" in under 40 hours. The best women's achievement is Sue Johnston's  in 2001. More than 30 competitors failed to reach the first book (two miles).

When a runner drops out of the race, a bugler plays "Taps" upon their return to the start/end point.

In 2017, Gary Robbins of North Vancouver, British Columbia, reached the finishing gate a mere six seconds after the 60-hour cut-off, almost becoming the 16th runner ever to complete the Barkley. However, he had taken a wrong turn in the final stages of the race, thus cutting two miles off the course; he would have been disqualified even if he had been faster. "The time, in that situation, is meaningless," Cantrell said of the six-second time overage.

In 2022, the race had its second earliest start in history, with the ceremonial cigarette being lit on March 8 at 6:54 AM local time. The only earlier date was the first event, 1986, when the race started on March 1.

Finishers
As of the completion of the 2023 event, the full, five-loop race has been completed 21 times by 17 runners.

See also
 Big's Backyard Ultra

References

Further reading

Furtaw, Ed. (2010) Tales From Out There: The Barkley Marathons, The World's Toughest Trail Race, CreateSpace.

External links
 Matt Mahoney's Barkley Marathons Site
 Davy Crockett, "Barkley Marathons – The Birth"
 Davy Crockett, "Barkley Marathons – First Few Years"
 Top 10 Barkley Documentaries
 The Believer magazine article - "The Immortal Horizon"
 "Out There" at the Barkley: Portraits From the Edge of Endurance
 "Barkley 100" documentary short film by Brendan Young
 Metro Pulse Article
 The Barkley Marathons: The Race That Eats Its Young feature length documentary film
 "Tales From Out There: The Barkley Marathons, The World's Toughest Trail Race"
 Interview with Nick Hollan after 2013 Barkley Marathons from Talk Ultra Podcast
 Interview with 3-time finisher Jared Campbell and Gary Robbins after 2015 Barkley Marathons from the Ginger Runner Live Podcast
 Interview with 2017 finisher John Kelly from The Bad Boy Running Podcast 
 Interview with Guillaume Calmettes, Maggie Guterl, and Amelia Boone after 2018 Barkley Marathons from the Ginger Runner Live Podcast
 Interview with Eoin Keith and Ally Beaven after 2018 Barkley Marathons from the Talk Ultra Podcast
 Where Dreams Go to Die: Gary Robbins and the Barkley Marathons feature length documentary film

Annual sporting events in the United States
Sports competitions in Tennessee
Morgan County, Tennessee
Multiday races
Sports in Tennessee
Ultramarathons in the United States
Recurring sporting events established in 1986